The women's circle sepak takraw competition at the 1998 Asian Games in Bangkok was held from 18 to 19 December at the Indoor Stadium Huamark.

Schedule
All times are Indochina Time (UTC+07:00)

Squads

Results

Preliminaries

Round 2

Group 1

Group 2

Final

References 

Results

Sepak takraw at the 1998 Asian Games